Prema Nagar is a 1971 Indian Telugu-language romance film directed by K. S. Prakash Rao and produced by D. Ramanaidu under the Suresh Productions banner. It stars Akkineni Nageswara Rao and Vanisri with music composed by K. V. Mahadevan. The film is based on a novel of the same name by Koduri Kausalya Devi.

Prema Nagar was an all time blockbuster, grossing ₹1.45 crores at the box office. D. Ramanaidu whose earlier films had failed and was in financial troubles had a dramatic turnaround in his career with the stupendous success of Prema Nagar. The film had a theatrical run of over 750 days. The film was remade in Tamil as Vasantha Maligai (1972) and in Hindi as Prem Nagar (1974) by K. S. Prakash Rao himself.

Plot
Kalyan (Akkineni Nageswara Rao), the second son of a wealthy Zamindar family, is a happy-go-lucky guy who enjoys his life with wine and women. Latha (Vanisri) a middle-class woman working as an air hostess, lives with her father (Gummadi), mother (Hemalatha), two brothers, and a sister. Her elder brother (Kakarala) resides at home with his wife, but Latha is the highest-earning member of the family, so she decides to change her profession. She joins as a secretary to Kalyan.

The next day Kalyan takes her to his estate, where she meets his mother (Shantha Kumari), elder brother Kesava Varma (Satyanarayana), and sister-in-law Indrani (S. Varalakshmi). Latha soon notices that Kalyan is an alcoholic and, therefore, wishes to resign, but a servant begs her not to because Kalyan's behavior has changed for the better since meeting her.

Latha, assures Kalyan's mother, that she will try and stop Kalyan from drinking. One day Latha tries to stop Kalyan from drinking; she throws the glass after arguing with him, infuriating Kalyan into throwing a bottle at her, where he realizes his mistake, he destroys all his bottles, promising Latha that he will never drink again.

After that, Kalyan starts loving Latha deeply and he contracts a new palace in the name of her love called Prema Nagar. Kesava Varma witnesses all this and runs to tell his mother. He conjures a story about Latha having stolen his wife's jewelry. Hearing this, Kalyan becomes suspicious of Latha. He asks Latha about it, but she runs away utterly dejected that he could suspect her of such wrongdoing. Fortunately, Kalyan overhears his servant Dasu (Rajababu) whispering to another about Kesava's malicious plan.

Kalyan confesses his ignorance and apologizes. But Latha will not forgive him. Kalyan loses his composure and becomes seriously ill. Meanwhile, Latha receives a marriage proposal. Kalyan's mother goes to apologize to Latha while Latha hands her an invitation to her wedding. She shows this to her son, who then decides to attend the wedding, and Latha is shocked to see him. She meets him privately to reconcile their differences but, unfortunately, her sister-in-law spots them and announces it to the guests. All depart, leaving Latha with her family. Then, all of a sudden, Kalyan's mother enters the room and declares that Latha should marry his son. When Latha arrives at the palace, she is shocked to see Kalyan's condition, that out of desperation and lovesickness he had poisoned himself. But anyhow Kalyan is rescued by taken to the hospital, leading to a happy ending.

Cast

Akkineni Nageswara Rao as Kalyan
Vanisri as Lata
S. V. Ranga Rao as Kalyan's father
Gummadi as Latha's father
Satyanarayana as Kesava Varma
Raja Babu as Dasu
V. Nagayya as Doctor 
Dhulipala as Diwanji
Ramana Reddy
K. V. Chalam as Cook
Raavi Kondala Rao as School Teacher
Sakshi Ranga Rao as Priest
Kakarala as Latha's brother 
Santha Kumari as Kalyan's mother
Hemalatha as Latha's mother 
Suryakantham 
S. Varalakshmi as Indrani 
Rama Prabha as Hamsa
Jyothi Lakshmi as item number 
Chalapathi Rao as doctor
Pushpalatha as Ayya 
Pushpa Kumari as Gowri
Meena Kumari as Kamala 
Master Venkatesh as Young Keshav Varma

Production
The film is based on the novel of the same name written by Koduri Kausalya Devi. K. S. Prakash Rao scripted the film with dialogue given by Acharya Aatreya. K. A. Marthand performed the editing while S. Venkataratnam handled the cinematography. S. Krishna Rao is the Art Director.

Soundtrack

Music composed by K. V. Mahadevan. Lyrics were written by Acharya Aatreya.

References

External links
 

1971 films
Telugu films remade in other languages
Films scored by K. V. Mahadevan
Films based on Indian novels
1970s Telugu-language films
Films directed by K. S. Prakash Rao
Suresh Productions films